Roman Wall Blues is the first solo album by Alex Harvey made after the Soul Band, and his time in the Hair pit band. This album was released in 1969 and contains one song from Hair ("Donna"), plus some Harvey originals, ("Midnight Moses", "Roman Wall Blues" and "Hammer Song"); that he would later re-record with The Sensational Alex Harvey Band. The title track was a couplet sonnet by W.H. Auden about the life of a Roman soldier.

The album was recorded at Philips (Phonogram) Studio, London.

Track listings
All tracks composed by Alex Harvey; except where indicated
"Midnight Moses" – 3:30
"Hello L.A., Bye Bye Birmingham" (Delaney Bramlett, Mac Davis) – 2:29
"Broken Hearted Fairytale" (Harvey, Andy McMaster) – 3:41
"Donna" (James Rado, Gerome Ragni, Galt MacDermot) – 2:21
"Roman Wall Blues" (W. H. Auden, Alex Harvey) – 2:50
"Jumping Jack Flash" (Mick Jagger, Keith Richards) – 3:14
"Hammer Song" – 3:12
"Let My Bluebird Sing" – 3:40
"Maxine" (A. Foray) – 4:40
"(Down at) Bart's Place" – 4:21
"Candy" – 2:57

Personnel

Musicians
 Alex Harvey – guitar, vocals
 Leslie Harvey – guitar
 Mickey Keene – guitar
 Bud Parkes – trumpet
 Derek Watkins – trumpet
 Derek Wadsworth – trombone, brass arrangements
 Frank Ricotti – alto saxophone, percussion, brass arrangements
 Ashton Tootell – baritone saxophone, flute
 Laurie Baker – bass guitar, electronics/effects
 Maurice Cockerill – keyboard
 Pete Woolf – drums

Technical
 Brian Shepherd – producer
 David Voyde – engineer
 Robin Nicol – sleeve design

References

1969 albums
Alex Harvey (musician) albums
Albums arranged by Derek Wadsworth
Fontana Records albums